Warmians are a Polish ethnic group from Warmia. Most of them are Roman Catholic and speak in Warmian subdialect of Polish language or German language.

History 

Between the 14th and 17th centuries, settlers from northern, Mazovia moved to former territories of Old Prussians, following conquests by the Teutonic Order, and the erection of the Monastic state of the Teutonic Knights.

The bishopric of Warmia became in 1466 an autonomous part of Royal Prussia, and remained part of the Polish–Lithuanian Commonwealth until 1772 when it was annexed by the Kingdom of Prussia (see: Partitions of Poland). While the Mazurs in the neighboring Ducal Prussia became Protestants when that Duchy adopted Lutheranism in the 16th century, most Warmiaks, populating the areas around Olsztyn, remained Catholics.

During World War II, the Warmiaks were persecuted by the Nazi German government, which wanted to erase all aspects of Polish culture and Polish language in Warmia.

After the war, due to their Polish roots, they were not victims of the large-scale expulsion of Germans, but over the course of time, large numbers of Warmiaks decided to leave their native land and settle in more prosperous West Germany, exercising their right to German citizenship granted by the Basic Law as citizens or their descendants of inhabitants of Germany in the borders of 1937.

Notes

References 

Ethnic groups in Poland
Ethnic groups in Germany
Prussia